Edel Nielsen (19 April 1912 – 15 January 1969) was a Danish swimmer. She competed in the women's 200 metre breaststroke at the 1936 Summer Olympics.

References

External links
 

1912 births
1969 deaths
Danish female breaststroke swimmers
Olympic swimmers of Denmark
Swimmers at the 1936 Summer Olympics
Swimmers from Copenhagen